Parigas may refer to:

Places
 Parigas, Chinese name for Demchok, Ladakh
 Parigas region, Chinese name for the disputed Demchok sector